The Girlfriend or The Girl Friend may refer to:

 The Girl Friend, a 1926 Broadway musical
 The Girl Friend (film), a 1935 musical comedy
 The Girlfriend (film), a 1988 Argentine-German historical drama
 "The Girlfriend" (The O.C.), an episode of The O.C.

See also

Girlfriend (disambiguation)